Class 142 may refer to:

British Rail Class 142
DR Class 130 family
Zobel-class fast attack craft, also known as Type 142